The OVW National Heavyweight Championship is a professional wrestling heavyweight championship created and promoted by the Ohio Valley Wrestling (OVW) promotion. There have been a total of four reigns shared between four different champions. The current title holder is Jessie Godderz who is in his second reign.

Title history

Reigns

Combined reigns 

See also
OVW Heavyweight Championship
OVW Southern Tag Team Championship
OVW Television Championship
OVW Women's Championship

References

External links
OVW National Heavyweight Championship History

Ohio Valley Wrestling championships
National professional wrestling championships
Heavyweight wrestling championships